Haris Antti Laitinen Donoukarás (born 5 December 1984) is a Swedish former footballer who played as a midfielder.

Career
He signed for Assyriska Föreningen after leaving Hammarby IF in December 2009.
He went to Hammarby from Hammarby Talang FF for the 2004 season.
After the 2006 season with IFK Norrköping on loan, he returned to Hammarby.

References

External links 
 

Swedish footballers
Hammarby Talang FF players
Hammarby Fotboll players
IFK Norrköping players
Assyriska FF players
Swedish people of Finnish descent
AFC Eskilstuna players
1984 births
Living people
Association football midfielders